Episcopal Church of the Epiphany is a historic church located in New Iberia, Louisiana.

It is a one-story  building which was built during 1857-58 of cypress timbers and bricks that were made by slaves.  Its side walls were reinforced by exterior buttresses in 1884, when a belfry was also added.  It was renovated in 1959.

The church was listed on the National Register of Historic Places on April 29, 1977.

See also
National Register of Historic Places listings in Iberia Parish, Louisiana

References

External links

New Iberia, Louisiana
Episcopal church buildings in Louisiana
Churches on the National Register of Historic Places in Louisiana
Gothic Revival church buildings in Louisiana
Churches completed in 1858
Churches in Iberia Parish, Louisiana
19th-century Episcopal church buildings
National Register of Historic Places in Iberia Parish, Louisiana
1858 establishments in Louisiana